Chicken parmesan, or chicken parmigiana, is a dish that consists of breaded chicken breast covered in tomato sauce and mozzarella, parmesan, or provolone cheese. A quantity of ham or bacon is sometimes added.

The dish originated in the Italian diaspora in the United States during the early 20th century. It has been speculated that the dish is based on a combination of the Italian parmigiana di melanzane, a dish using fried eggplant slices and tomato sauce, with a cotoletta, a breaded veal cutlet generally served without sauce or cheese in Italy.

Chicken parmesan is included as the base of a number of different meals, including sandwiches and pies, and the meal is used as the subject of eating contests at some restaurants.

History

North America
The dish, also known as "chicken parm", originated in the northeast United States from Italian immigrants, and became a popular staple in restaurants serving Italian-American cuisine by the 1950s. Home versions also grew in popularity. A recipe was published in the 1953 issue of the New York Herald Tribune that used frozen fried chicken patties or fillets along with other pre-processed foods to make a version of the dish at home. A recipe for chicken parmesan was published in The New York Times in 1962.

In the United States and Canada, chicken parmesan is often served as a main course, and sometimes with a side of, or on top of pasta. Many restaurants also offer chicken parm sandwiches. Upon arriving in America, Italian immigrants began to take advantage of America's affordable meat market, incorporating chicken into parmigiana.

Australia
 
Chicken parmigiana was known in Australia by the 1950s. It was offered in restaurants in Adelaide as early as 1953. It is regularly served as a main meal throughout Australia, where it is considered a staple of pub food. In a 2019 interview that was broadcast on ABC Radio Hobart, food historian Jan O'Connell believes that chicken parmigiana did not become a pub staple until the 1980s; before that time it was primarily served in restaurants.

Chicken parmigiana is typically served in Australia with a side of chips and salad, although there is some dispute as to whether the chips should be served under or next to the chicken. Its popularity has led to a specialized chicken parmigiana restaurant opening in Melbourne, and chicken parmigiana is the subject of reviews on dedicated websites which compare the dish as purchased from various pubs within a region. The dish's colloquial name varies across regions, with 'parmy', 'parmi' and 'parma' the most popular variations.

Variations

Asian fusion cooking

In fusion cuisine, chicken parmesan has been modified to suit Asian taste preferences by the addition of a small amount of soy sauce (as a salt substitute) to the tomato-based sauce and sometimes served with a side of rice or stir-fried noodles. This dish is sometimes marketed in English-speaking areas as chicken katsu parmesan. Sometimes, the soy sauce is added instead to the egg wash for the chicken.

Similar dishes

Italy

Aside from the melanzane alla Parmigiana, a dish using breaded eggplant slices instead of chicken, there are other similar dishes in Italy that use meat.

Carne pizzaiola is a dish derived from the Neapolitan tradition that features meat topped with cheese and often cooked with tomatoes, olive oil, garlic, and white wine. Beef is used most often but it can be made with chicken and pork as well.

A similar dish using veal is known in Italian as cotoletta alla Bolognese, which excludes tomato sauce but includes melted parmesan cheese and prosciutto. Costolette Parmigiana is another similar veal dish, but in Italy it is generally served without sauce or cheese.

United Kingdom

In England, parmo is a dish originating in Middlesbrough that typically consists of fried breaded chicken or pork topped with a white béchamel sauce and cheese instead of tomato sauce. Parmo originated as escalope Parmesan, a derivative of chicken parmigiana.

Argentina

In Argentina, a variation of milanesa a la napolitana is made with chicken instead of the usual beef, similar to chicken parmigiana. It is sometimes topped with ham, bacon, or a fried egg and is usually served with french fries.

See also

 List of chicken dishes

References

External links

Italian-American chicken dishes
Italian-Australian culture
Italian-Canadian culture
Italian-New Zealand culture
Australian cuisine